Reza Hassanzadeh (born in Tabriz — died 2006 in Asaloyeh, Iran) was an Iranian football player who played for Tractor F.C. for most of his career. Also he was playing defender in Sepahan F.C. and won the Iran Pro League and Hazfi Cup with this team.

Awards and honours

Club
Sepahan
Iran Pro League (1): 2002–03
Hazfi Cup (1): 2003–04

Notes

References 
 سنگ قبر بازیکن جوان و فقید تراکتورسازی+عکس Nasrnews

2006 deaths
Iranian footballers
Sepahan S.C. footballers
Tractor S.C. players
Machine Sazi F.C. players
Sportspeople from Tabriz
Iran international footballers
Association football defenders
Year of birth missing